Mammillaria pottsii, also known as fox-tail cactus or rat-tail nipple cactus, is a species of flowering plant in the family Cactaceae. It was first described by Scheer ex Salm-Dyck, Cact. Hort. 1849: 104 (1850) According to the United Nations Environment Programme, M. leona is a synonym for M. pottsii.

References

pottsii